Teller ( or ) is a city in the Nome Census Area, Alaska, United States. At the 2010 census the population was 229, a decrease from 268 in 2000.

It is situated on the southern half of the spit called Nuuk in Inupiaq, which separates Port Clarence Bay (see also Port Clarence, Alaska) and Grantley Harbor, at the outlet of the Imuruk Basin.

History

The 1825-28 Beechey expedition found three camps with a total of some 400 inhabitants and a winter camp site with burial grounds in a roughly  radius around the later site of Teller on September 1, 1827.

An expedition from the Western Union telegraph spent the winter at the present site of Teller in 1866 and 1867; they called it Libbyville or Libby Station. When the United States Government introduced reindeer herding in Alaska, the Teller Reindeer Station operated from 1892 to 1900 at a nearby site. The station was named for United States Senator and Secretary of the Interior Henry Moore Teller in 1892 by Sheldon Jackson.

Teller was established in 1900 after the Bluestone Placer Mine discovery  to the south. It took its name from the reindeer herding station. During the boom years in the early 20th century, Teller had a population of about 5,000 and was a major regional trading center. Natives from Diomede, Wales, Mary's Igloo, and King Island came to trade there.

The Norwegian Evangelical Lutheran Church built Teller Mission across the harbor from Teller in 1900. The mission was renamed Brevig Mission in 1903, after the Reverend T.L. Brevig, who also served briefly as Teller's first postmaster, a post to which he was appointed 2 April 1900.

The dirigible Norge detoured to Teller on its first flight over the North Pole from Norway to Nome in 1926. Many present residents of Teller came from Mary's Igloo. Mary's Igloo is now a summer fishing camp and has no permanent residents.

Today, Teller is an Inupiat village that depends on subsistence hunting and fishing.

Geography

Climate
Teller has a continental subarctic climate (Köppen Dfc), although its climate nearly qualifies as a tundra climate (Köppen ET).

Demographics

Teller first appeared on the 1910 U.S. Census as an unincorporated village. The census bureau erroneously reported the name as Fuller. It reported correctly as Teller since 1920. It was formally incorporated in 1963.

As of the census  of 2000, there were 268 people, 76 households, and 61 families residing in the city. The racial makeup of the city was 7.46% White and 92.54% Native American.  0.37% of the population were Hispanic or Latino of any race.

Of the 76 households, 53.9% had children under the age of 18 living with them, 36.8% were married couples living together, 15.8% had a female householder with no husband present, and 19.7% were non-families. 18.4% of all households were made up of individuals, and 5.3% had someone living alone who was 65 years of age or older.  The average household size was 3.53 and the average family size was 3.80.

In the city, the age distribution of the population shows 41.4% under the age of 18, 9.7% from 18 to 24, 26.5% from 25 to 44, 15.7% from 45 to 64, and 6.7% who were 65 years of age or older.  The median age was 24 years. For every 100 females, there were 135.1 males.  For every 100 females age 18 and over, there were 134.3 males.

The median income for a household in the city was $23,000, and the median income for a family was $20,000. Males had a median income of $25,625 versus $31,250 for females. The per capita income for the city was $8,617.  About 33.9% of families and 37.7% of the population were below the poverty line, including 45.0% of those under the age of 18 and 27.8% of those 65 or over.

Education
Teller is served by the Bering Strait School District. James C. Isabell School serves grades Pre-K through 12.

Notable people
Libby Riddles (born 1956), dog musher, author

References

External links

Cities in Alaska
Cities in Nome Census Area, Alaska
Mining communities in Alaska
Populated coastal places in Alaska on the Pacific Ocean
Populated places in the Seward Peninsula